"Loud Love" is a song by the American rock band Soundgarden. Written by frontman Chris Cornell, "Loud Love" was released on August 30, 1989 as the first single from the band's second studio album, Louder Than Love (1989). It is the quasi-title track from that album, and was also the basis for the EP Loudest Love and the live video Louder Than Live. The song was included on Soundgarden's 1997 greatest hits album, A-Sides.

Origin and recording
"Loud Love" was written by frontman Chris Cornell. Guitarist Kim Thayil on the song:
The intro was a feedback melody. Many people think we used an E-bow. I've seen transcriptions that have said to use an E-bow. The truth is, I've never even seen an E-bow. I simply stood in front of the amp, got the note ringing until it was feeding back, and slid my finger up the fret on the string and dragged the feedback with it.

Release and reception
"Loud Love" was released as a single in 1989 with a previously unreleased B-side titled "Fresh Deadly Roses".

"Loud Love" is featured in the 1992 film, Wayne's World. It can be heard playing in the background in the scene where Wayne meets Cassandra. It does not feature on the soundtrack album, however.

Music video
The music video for "Loud Love" was directed by Kevin Kerslake, who would later direct the music video for "Hands All Over". The video features the band performing the song amid scenes of car crashes. It also features bassist Jason Everman (who appears on the cover of the single) although he does not play on the record. The video was released in October 1989. The video is available on the home video release Louder Than Live.

Track listing
All songs written by Chris Cornell, except where noted:
"Loud Love" – 4:57
"Big Dumb Sex" (dub version) – 6:06
"Get on the Snake" (Cornell, Kim Thayil) – 3:44
"Fresh Deadly Roses" – 4:53

Chart positions

References

1989 singles
1989 songs
A&M Records singles
Song recordings produced by Chris Cornell
Song recordings produced by Matt Cameron
Song recordings produced by Terry Date
Songs written by Chris Cornell
Soundgarden songs
Music videos directed by Kevin Kerslake